Dzieduszyckia is the scientific name of two genera of organisms and may refer to:

Dzieduszyckia (brachiopod), a genus of brachiopods
Dzieduszyckia (plant), a genus of plants currently considered to be a synonym of Ruppia